The following is a list of episodes for the television show Profiler.

Series overview

Episodes

Season 1 (1996–97)

Season 2 (1997–98)

Season 3 (1998–99)

Season 4 (1999–2000)

External links
 
 

Profiler